Cruimthear Mac Carthaigh (the presbyter Mac Carrthaigh), fl. c. 550.

In the genealogies, Mac Carthaigh - his forename, not his surname - is stated as being a native of Conmaícne Cúl Toland in what is now along the County Galway - County Mayo. Thus he was from the same tribal group of Jarlath of Tuam. This branch of the Conmaicne were said to converge, or descend, from Cumhscraidh mac Céacht, who in turn was a descendant of Lugaid mac Con. It is unclear which church he was attached to.

References

 Irish Kings and High Kings, Francis John Byrne, 2001 (second edition).
 The Great Book of Irish Genealogies, 731.3, 731.5, pp. 718–19, volume two, Dubhaltach MacFhirbhisigh; edited, with translation and indices by Nollaig Ó Muraíle, 2003-2004. .

Christian clergy from County Galway
Monarchs from County Mayo
6th-century Irish priests
People of Conmaicne Cuile Toladh